Jack Walker (1929–2000) was a British industrialist and investor in Blackburn Rovers football club.

Jack Walker may also refer to:
 Jack Walker (baseball), Negro league baseball player
 Jack Walker (cricketer) (1914–1968), English cricketer
 Jack Walker (ice hockey) (1888–1950), Canadian ice hockey forward
 Jack Walker (Coronation Street), a fictional character in the British soap opera Coronation Street
 Jack Walker (association footballer) (1882–1960), English footballer
 Jack Walker (rugby league) (born 1999), English rugby league player
 Jack Walker (rugby union) (born 1996), English rugby union player
 Jack D. Walker (1922–2005), Lieutenant Governor of Kansas
 Jack E. Walker (1910–1979), American politician
 Jack P. Walker (1892–1916), Australian rules footballer who played with St Kilda
 Jack J. Walker (1910–1982), Australian rules footballer who played with Geelong
 Jack Walker (athlete), English pole vaulter

See also
 John Walker (disambiguation)